Diaphanocephalidae is a family of nematodes belonging to the order Rhabditida.

Genera:
 Cylicostrongylus Yamaguti, 1961
 Diaphanocephalus Diesing, 1851
 Kalicephalus Molin, 1861

References

Nematodes